The 2019 season was the San Francisco 49ers' 70th in the National Football League (NFL), their 74th overall and their third under the head coach-general manager tandem of Kyle Shanahan and John Lynch. They finished their 2019 season with a 13–3 record, their best finish since 2011. Starting the season 8–0 for the first time since 1990, the 49ers surpassed their win totals from the 2016, 2017, and 2018 seasons combined. The 49ers were the second straight NFC West team to start 8–0, with the other being the 2018 Rams. With a Week 11 win over the Arizona Cardinals, the 49ers clinched their first winning season since 2013. Despite a loss to the Atlanta Falcons in Week 15, the 49ers clinched a playoff spot for the first time since 2013 with a Los Angeles Rams loss. The 49ers beat the Cardinals for the first time since 2014, won in Seattle for the first time since 2011, and beat the Panthers in the regular season for the first time since 2001.

The 49ers saw significant improvements during the season on both sides of the ball, and with some analysts naming it one of the greatest single season turnarounds in NFL history. Their offense finished second in the league in scoring (479 points, most for the franchise since 1998), second in rushing yards per game (144 yards per game), first in rushing touchdowns (23), and third in point differential (+169). The defense was sixth in the league in forced turnovers (27), second in total defense (281.8 yards per game), first in passing defense (169.2 yards per game), and fourth in sacks (48). This was the first time since 2003 that the 49ers finished in the top 10 in both scoring and yards per game.

The 49ers were the top seed in their conference, winning a tiebreaker with the Packers and New Orleans Saints due to head-to-head records. This was the first time the 49ers obtained home field advantage throughout the playoffs since the 1997 season. In the playoffs, the 49ers defeated the Minnesota Vikings in the Divisional Round and the Packers in the NFC Championship Game, advancing to Super Bowl LIV, their first championship appearance since the 2012 season. However, the 49ers lost Super Bowl LIV to the Kansas City Chiefs 31–20. Despite having a 20–10 lead heading into the fourth quarter, the 49ers suffered their second Super Bowl loss in franchise history. It was the first time the 49ers lost a Super Bowl when leading after the third quarter (previously 4–0). The Niners also failed to join the Pittsburgh Steelers and New England Patriots as the only franchises to win 6 Super Bowls, or win their first title in 25 years.

2019 NFL Draft

Notes
 The 49ers traded their fifth-round selection to the Detroit Lions in exchange for guard Laken Tomlinson.
 The 49ers conditionally swapped seventh-round selections with the Kansas City Chiefs in a trade in which the 49ers acquired wide receiver Rod Streater from the Chiefs.
 The 49ers traded Kansas City Chiefs seventh-round selection to the Cleveland Browns in exchange for tackle Shon Coleman.
 As the result of a negative differential of free agent signings and departures that the 49ers experienced during the  free agency period, the team has received one six-round compensatory selection for the 2019 draft.

Staff

Final roster

Preseason

Regular season

Schedule

Game summaries

Week 1: at Tampa Bay Buccaneers

The revamped 49ers defense put on a show on opening day. Despite an average day by the 49ers offense, the defense dominated the Buccaneers offense. The defense sacked Jameis Winston three times and forced four turnovers, including returning two interceptions for touchdowns. The 49ers three interceptions in this game surpassed all of last year, as they only had two interceptions the entire season in 2018.

Week 2: at Cincinnati Bengals

The 49ers were the road team for the second consecutive game, and they routed the Bengals 41–17 with their most complete performance in years. The 49ers offense racked up an astounding 571 yards of offense, including 259 yards rushing. They averaged 6.2 yards per rush and 8.4 yards per play during the game. Jimmy Garoppolo finished 17–25 passing with 296 yards and three touchdown passes, while Matt Brieda lead the team with 121 yards rushing. The 49ers defense surrendered just 25 yards rushing, along with four sacks and one turnover. The blowout win over the Bengals on the road helped the 49ers to their first 2–0 start since 2012. The 49ers were 0–8 on the road during the 2018 season, but they started the 2019 season 2–0 on the road.

Week 3: vs. Pittsburgh Steelers

The 49ers faced adversity for the first time during the 2019 season. Despite outgaining the Steelers in yardage 436–239, the game was close due to the 49ers committing an unprecedented five turnovers, including three fumbles inside the Steelers 25-yard line. The worst of the bunch came with 6:49 left in the game; with the 49ers at third-and-goal from the Pittsburgh 7-yard line, an errant snap hit 49ers running back Jeff Wilson Jr (who was in motion), and was recovered by T. J. Watt of the Steelers. The 49ers defense responded by forcing Steelers James Conner to fumble, giving San Francisco the ball back. From there, Garoppolo hit Dante Pettis for a 5-yard touchdown pass, giving the 49ers the lead with just 1:15 left to play. The 49ers defense then held to give them the 24–20 win. Points off turnovers ended up being the difference; despite the five turnovers given up, the 49ers held Pittsburgh to just six points off them, both coming on Chris Boswell field goals in the first quarter. The close win over the Steelers at home helped the 49ers to their first 3–0 start since 1998 as they went into their bye week.

Week 5: vs. Cleveland Browns

The blowout win over the Browns at home helped the 49ers to their first 4–0 start since 1990, during the Joe Montana era. Notably, 49ers DE Nick Bosa celebrated a sack of Browns QB Baker Mayfield with a faux flag planting motion, echoing Mayfield's own celebration some years earlier when the two faced off at the NCAA level.

Week 6: at Los Angeles Rams

This game was the biggest test of the year so far for the 49ers, as they played the defending NFC champion Rams. Multiple sports analysts predicted the Rams to win. The result was the 49ers' best defensive effort in years. They held the high-powered Rams offense to just 157 total yards and seven points, which the Rams scored on their first possession of the game (a Robert Woods 8-yard touchdown run). The Rams were shut out for the remainder of the game. A goal line stand by the 49ers defense in the second quarter, in which Malcolm Brown was stuffed on fourth-and-goal from the 1-yard line and 49ers defensive coordinator Robert Saleh garnered fame for his ebullient reaction to the play, flipped the script in the 49ers' favor. Rams quarterback Jared Goff threw for just 78 yards during the game and was sacked four times. The 49ers had 331 yards of offense and 22 first downs compared to the Rams, who had 157 yards and just 10 first downs.

With the win over the Rams on the road, the 49ers started 5–0 for the first time since 1990.

Week 7: at Washington Redskins

In a game that was affected by heavy rain and a slippery field, three field goals by 49ers Robbie Gould were the only scores in the game. The 49ers defense again dominated, holding the Redskins to just 154 yards of offense. This was the first shutout win for the 49ers since their 2016 season opener, ironically also against Case Keenum. With the road win over the Redskins, the 49ers started 6–0 for the first time since 1990. Their 9 points scored was the fewest by a winning team all season.

Week 8: vs. Carolina Panthers

With the blowout win over the Panthers at home, the 49ers started 7–0 for the first time since 1990.

Week 9: at Arizona Cardinals

Coming into the game, the 49ers were on an eight-game winless streak against the Cardinals, having not beaten them since Week 17 of the 2014 season. The usually stout 49ers defense gave up an opening drive touchdown for the first time all year, giving up a 4-yard rushing touchdown to Kenyan Drake. The 49ers tied it just before the close of the first quarter with a 30-yard touchdown pass from Jimmy Garoppolo to George Kittle. The 49ers went into halftime with a 21–7 lead, aided by a blunder by Cardinals coach Kliff Kingsbury; he called a timeout when the 49ers had been stuffed at the goal line on fourth-and-goal. The timeout gave the 49ers another chance, and they converted with an Emmanuel Sanders 1-yard touchdown catch. The 49ers built a 28–14 lead in the third quarter with a 21-yard touchdown catch by Dante Pettis. A furious comeback by the Cardinals made it a three-point game, but the 49ers ended the game with an 11 play drive, including three third down conversions. The last was an 11-yard pass by Garoppolo to Ross Dwelley on third-and-9 to seal the game. Jimmy Garoppolo had his finest game as a 49er, throwing for 317 yards and four touchdown passes, a career high. With the close win over the Cardinals on the road, the 49ers started 8–0 for the first time since 1990, and had their first win against Arizona in five seasons.

Week 10: vs. Seattle Seahawks

The 49ers welcomed the archrival Seattle Seahawks in a Monday Night Football showdown in a highly anticipated game. The 49ers had a great start, taking a 10–0 lead after a 10-yard touchdown catch by receiver Kendrick Bourne. But after Emmanuel Sanders went out of the game with an injury (the 49ers were also without top tight end George Kittle and kicker Robbie Gould due to injuries), the 49ers offense sputtered for over two quarters, allowing the Seahawks to take control. After falling behind 21–10 in the third quarter, the game changed in the 49ers' favor after a strip sack of Russell Wilson led to a 12-yard fumble recovery touchdown by DeForest Buckner. The 49ers sent it into overtime with a field goal by kicker Chase McLauglin as time expired. In overtime, the Seahawks were able to get to the 49ers' 14-yard line, but Dre Greenlaw intercepted the ball and returned it to the Seattle 49-yard line. With the game on the line, replacement kicker McLaughlin shanked the game-winning field goal, giving Seattle another try. Kicker Jason Myers of Seattle won it as time expired. The two teams combined for seven turnovers (four by Seattle; three by San Francisco). With their first loss of the season, the 49ers fell to 8–1. It also dropped the 49ers' record to 1–11 in the last 12 games against the Seahawks.

Week 11: vs. Arizona Cardinals

A week after their first loss of the season, the 49ers responded by coming out sluggish and uninspired, falling behind 16–0 to the Cardinals. The 49ers rallied to take the lead in the third quarter, only to give up a go-ahead touchdown to fall behind 26–23 with 5:44 left. On the next drive, quarterback Jimmy Garoppolo tossed an interception, all but dooming the 49ers. But the 49ers defense forced a quick three-and-out and got the ball back with 2:02 left in the game. Garoppolo led the 49ers down the field in crunch time and threw a game-winning 25-yard touchdown pass to Jeff Wilson with just 31 seconds left to lead the 49ers to victory. It was Garoppolo's second game-winning touchdown pass this season, the first being in Week 3 against the Steelers. The 49ers tacked on another six points due to a fumble on lateral tries by the Cardinals, which was returned for a touchdown. With the win over the Cardinals, the 49ers improved to 9–1. They clinched their first winning season and swept the season series with the Cardinals for the first time since 2013.

Week 12: vs. Green Bay Packers

The 49ers started a tough three-game span with a Sunday Night game against the NFC North Division Leader Packers. The 49ers hammered Green Bay, holding Aaron Rodgers to just 104 yards passing and the entire Green Bay offense to 198 yards. The Packers were also held to just 1.7 yards per pass play, a career low for Aaron Rodgers. On the first possession of the game, the 49ers defense forced a fumble and recovered on the Packers 2-yard line. The next play, Tevin Coleman ran for a 2-yard touchdown, giving the 49ers a 7–0 lead and setting the tone for the rest of the game. Touchdown catches of 42 yards (Deebo Samuel) and 61 yards (George Kittle) were more than enough as the 49ers built a 23–0 halftime lead and never looked back. With the blowout win over the Packers, the 49ers improved to 10–1 and reached 10 wins for the first time since 2013.

Week 13: at Baltimore Ravens

The 49ers traveled to Baltimore seeking their eleventh win of the season against a red-hot Baltimore Ravens team. San Francisco opened the game with a seven-play possession culminating in a 33-yard touchdown pass from quarterback Jimmy Garoppolo to Deebo Samuel for a 7–0 lead. In doing so, the 49ers became the first team of the season to score an opening-drive touchdown against the Ravens. Following a Ravens punt, Garoppolo was sacked and fumbled the ball at his own 23, which was recovered by Baltimore. Two plays later the Ravens capitalized on the turnover, tying the game at 7 on a 20-yard Lamar Jackson touchdown pass to Mark Andrews. The 49ers punted on their next possession, after which Jackson orchestrated a 13-play drive culminating with him running the ball in from the 1-yard line for a touchdown and a 14–7 lead. The 49ers leveled the score on the ensuing drive with a 40-yard touchdown run by Raheem Mostert, but the Ravens regained the lead with a 30-yard Justin Tucker field goal, and led 17–14 at halftime. In the opening drive of the second half, the Ravens drove to the San Francisco 20-yard line before 49ers safety Marcell Harris stripped Jackson of the ball. The 49ers then went on a 14-play drive consuming 8:26 of clock time, but the drive stalled at the Baltimore 14 and they had to settle for a 32-yard Robbie Gould field goal, tying the game at 17. The score remained the same until, with 6:28 remaining in the game, Jackson and the Ravens drove the ball down to the San Francisco 31-yard line, where Tucker kicked a 49-yard field as time ran out. The 49ers dropped to 10–2 on the season with their second loss; both of them were decided by last-second field goals.

Week 14: at New Orleans Saints

In a game that had huge playoff seeding implications, including deciding the #1 seed, the 49ers prevailed in a back and forth affair in a 48–46 win in which both teams combined for 981 yards of offense. The 49ers fell behind 20–7 and 27–14 in the first half, surrendering touchdowns on the first four Saints possessions. But the 49ers rallied, with a trick play touchdown pass by Emmanuel Sanders to Raheem Mostert for 35 yards to cut the lead to 27–21. After forcing a punt, the 49ers went nine plays for 80 yards, with a Mostert 10-yard touchdown run to give the 49ers a 28–27 lead at halftime. The third quarter saw the 49ers outscore the Saints 7–6 to take a 35–33 lead into the final quarter. In the fourth quarter, the Saints scored a touchdown with 53 seconds left in the game to take a 46–45 lead. The following possession, with the 49ers facing a fourth-and-2 from their own 33-yard line with :39 left, Jimmy Garoppolo connected with George Kittle on a 39-yard pass to the New Orleans 28-yard line. A 15-yard face mask penalty by Saints safety Marcus Williams tacked on more yards during the play. Kicker Robbie Gould then connected on a 30-yard field goal as time expired, giving the 49ers the win. This was the second time this season the 49ers rallied from an early double-digit deficit and won. With the close win over the Saints, the 49ers improved to 11–2 on the season and they reached 11 wins for the first time since 2013.

As a result of this game, the 49ers finished the hardest three game stretch (by opponents' win percentage) in the Super Bowl era with a 2–1 record. No team has ever played three straight teams with an .800 or better winning percentage this late in the season.

Week 15: vs. Atlanta Falcons

After a tough three-game stretch during which the 49ers became the first team in NFL history to play three straight teams with an .800 or better winning percentage, fears of a trap game loomed ahead of a matchup against an inferior Atlanta squad. Those fears were vindicated as the 49ers were sluggish on both sides of the ball for most of the game. The 49ers were missing multiple starters on defense due to injury and struggled to get off the field, allowing Atlanta to go 7-for-13 on third downs. The Falcons scored a touchdown with :02 left in the game when Julio Jones caught a pass from Matt Ryan and was tackled at the goal line by Jimmie Ward just as the football crossed the plane, to take a 23–22 lead. A fumble on the ensuing kick off due to multiple laterals gave the Falcons another 6 points as time expired. The 49ers lost all three of their games by a combined 13 points, narrowest in the NFL. With the loss, the 49ers dropped to 11–3 on the year and fell to the #5 seed in the NFC with the Seattle Seahawks victory over the Carolina Panthers. Despite the loss, they backed into a playoff berth by virtue of the Los Angeles Rams losing to the Dallas Cowboys, which also allowed the Seattle Seahawks and Green Bay Packers to clinch spots in the playoffs.

Week 16: vs. Los Angeles Rams

Unlike Week 6 in which there were only 27 combined points between these teams, this game was a shootout. The Rams started out fast, with touchdowns by Brandin Cooks and Todd Gurley to give the Rams a 14–3 lead. Another touchdown by Rams running back Todd Gurley gave the Rams a 21–10 lead in the second quarter. After the 49ers cut the lead to 21–17, 49ers linebacker Fred Warner intercepted a Jared Goff pass and returned it for 46 yards for a touchdown to give the 49ers a 24–21 lead at halftime. In the second half, the 49ers offensive line struggled to protect quarterback Jimmy Garoppolo, giving up six sacks after halftime. This allowed the Rams to control the game and take a 28–24 lead. With 8:41 left in the game, Garoppolo led the 49ers on a 6 play, 91-yard drive that ended with a George Kittle seven-yard touchdown catch to give the 49ers a 31–28 lead. The defense surrendered a field goal to allow the Rams to tie the game at 31 with 2:30 left in regulation. On the following possession, in one of the most clutch performances of the season, Garoppolo led the 49ers down the field in crunch time. This included converting a third-and-16 with an 18-yard pass to receiver Kendrick Bourne, and then another third-and-16 conversion, this time a 46-yard pass to receiver Emmanuel Sanders, who was wide open due to a blown coverage to put the 49ers in field goal range. Kicker Robbie Gould won it as time expired with a 33-yard field goal, giving the 49ers the 34–31 win. This was the third time this season the 49ers trailed by double digits and came back to win the game. This was the fifth game-winning drive of the year for Garoppolo. With the close win over the Rams, the 49ers won 12 games for the first time since 2013. The 49ers swept the season series with the Rams for the first time since 2016 and regained possession of the #1 seed and the NFC West after the Cardinals upset the Seahawks.

Week 17: at Seattle Seahawks

In the 49ers' biggest game since the 2013 NFC Championship Game, they traveled to Seattle to decide not only who would win the division, but also if the 49ers could capture home-field advantage throughout the NFC playoffs. Prior to this game, the last time the 49ers had won at CenturyLink Field was on December 24, 2011. During that span, the 49ers failed to score twenty points in any of those games (going 0–7 from 2012 to 2018). In the first half, the 49ers dominated every aspect, taking a 13–0 halftime lead, aided by a Deebo Samuel 30-yard touchdown run on a pitch and catch. The 49ers also held Seattle to just 79 yards of total offense, including stuffing running back Marshawn Lynch on a fourth-and-inches attempt from the 49ers 31-yard line, causing a turnover on downs. In the second half, the Seahawks proved resilient, scoring multiple times. The Seahawks never led in this game, however, as the 49ers countered every Seahawks score with one of their own, including a Raheem Mostert 13-yard touchdown run to make it 26–14 with 5:51 left. After Seattle cut the lead to five, a questionable personal foul call against Ben Garland forced a punt, giving them the ball back with 2:27 left. They marched all the way down to the 49ers 1-yard line, but a delay of game penalty pushed them back to the 6-yard line. After three incomplete passes, the Seahawks faced fourth-and-goal. Russell Wilson hit receiver Jacob Hollister with a pass to the 49ers 1-yard line, but Hollister was stopped inches short of the goal line by linebacker Dre Greenlaw, causing a turnover on downs with nine seconds left that sealed the victory.

With the close win over the Seahawks, the 49ers snapped their seven-game losing streak at CenturyLink Field, while obtaining home-field advantage throughout the playoffs. This game also snapped the team's 22-year number one seed drought.

Standings

Division

Conference

Postseason

Schedule

Game summaries

NFC Divisional Playoffs: vs. (6) Minnesota Vikings

In the first playoff game at Levi's Stadium for the 49ers, they hosted the Minnesota Vikings for the first time since 1997. After winning the coin toss and deferring, they had a great start, forcing a three-and-out on the Vikings offense. They then proceeded to march 61 yards on just eight plays, culminating in a 3-yard touchdown pass from Jimmy Garoppolo to Kendrick Bourne to take a 7–0 lead. Garoppolo went 5-for-6 passing for 49 yards on that drive, silencing criticisms that he might be rattled in his first playoff game. The Vikings tied the game on a 41-yard touchdown pass from Kirk Cousins to Stefon Diggs on their ensuing possession. Later in the game, another three-and-out by the Vikings set the 49ers up with good field position, finished off by a Tevin Coleman 1-yard touchdown run to retake the lead, 14–7. Before halftime, Garoppolo threw an interception to Eric Kendricks to put the Vikings deep in 49ers territory, but the 49ers defense stood tall, forcing the Vikings to kick a field goal, sending the game into halftime with the 49ers leading 14–10.

From there, the 49ers completely dominated the second half, taking a 17–10 lead after a 35-yard Robbie Gould field goal on their opening possession after halftime. Partway through the third quarter, 49ers cornerback Richard Sherman intercepted a pass from Cousins, giving the 49ers great field position at the Vikings 44-yard line. The 49ers went 44 yards on eight successive run plays, and finishing the drive with a 2-yard touchdown run from Coleman to give the 49ers a 24–10 lead. For the rest of the game, the 49ers defense controlled the line of scrimmage and kept the Vikings off the board to give the 49ers their first playoff win since 2013.

The 49ers defense finished the game with six sacks and two forced turnovers, and surrendered just 147 total yards of offense. The Vikings earned just seven first downs on the day and had only 21 rushing yards, the fewest the 49ers had ever given up in a playoff game. On offense, the 49ers rushed for 186 yards on the day, more than the entire Vikings offense managed in the game.

NFC Championship: vs. (2) Green Bay Packers

The 49ers hosted the NFC Championship game for the first time since 2011.

Super Bowl LIV: vs. (A2) Kansas City Chiefs

References

External links
 
 

San Francisco
San Francisco 49ers seasons
San Francisco 49ers
NFC West championship seasons
National Football Conference championship seasons